Lyman F. Anderson (February 16, 1926 – October 25, 2005) was an American farmer and politician who served as a member of the Wisconsin State Assembly.

Early life and education
Anderson was born in Oregon, Wisconsin. He was the son of Frank Ramus Anderson and Mary Almeda Anderson. He graduated from Oregon High School in Oregon, Wisconsin and earned a bachelor's degree in history from the University of Wisconsin–Madison.

Career 
Anderson was active in local, county and state government for over four decades. He was elected to the Oregon Village Board in 1961 and served until 1974. Anderson served on the Dane County Board of Supervisors from 1972 to 1976 and again from 1980 to 2004. He represented the 47th Assembly District in the Wisconsin State Assembly from 1975 to 1977.

Personal life 
He died in 2005 after being hospitalized with kidney failure two years earlier.

The Lyman F. Anderson Agriculture & Conservation Center in Madison, Wisconsin is named in his honor.

References

External links
Anderson Farm County Park

1926 births
2005 deaths
Farmers from Wisconsin
Politicians from Madison, Wisconsin
Wisconsin city council members
County supervisors in Wisconsin
Republican Party members of the Wisconsin State Assembly
University of Wisconsin–Madison College of Letters and Science alumni
20th-century American politicians
People from Oregon, Wisconsin